Steinlen (1983 – 9 June 2001) was a Thoroughbred racehorse grass champion male. He was voted the American Champion Male Turf Horse for 1989 following his win in that year's Breeders' Cup Mile.

He was bred in the name of Allez France Stables, a nom de course for owner Daniel Wildenstein. Steinlen was a stakes winner in France prior to being sent to compete in the United States. Under trainer D. Wayne Lukas Steinlen won the important Arlington Million and Bernard Baruch Handicap leading up to his victory in the November 4, 1989  Breeders' Cup Mile. He was retired with 20 wins from 45 starts and earnings of $3,297,169. He entered stud in 1996 at William S. Farish's Lane's End Farm near Paris, Kentucky and was moved to Harris Farms in Coalinga, California.

Steinlen was humanely euthanised at age 18 in June 2001 after fracturing a rear leg in a paddock accident at Harris Farms.

At stud
Among his progeny, Steinlen was the sire of Alexis Federovna (GB), Cousin Joe(USA),  Flammarion (USA), Madame Steinlen (GB), Miss Union Avenue (USA), Top Of Our Game (USA) and Sainte Addresse(USA).

External  link
 Steinlen pedigree

References

1983 racehorse births
2001 racehorse deaths
Thoroughbred family 16-c
Racehorses bred in the United Kingdom
Racehorses trained in France
Racehorses trained in the United States
Breeders' Cup Mile winners